Billboard Top Rock'n'Roll Hits: 1968 is a compilation album released by Rhino Records in 1989, featuring 10 hit recordings from 1968.

The album includes five songs that reached the top of the Billboard Hot 100 chart. The remaining five tracks each reached the Hot 100's Top 5.  When the album was re-release in 1993, a number of tracks were taken off the collection and replaced with other hits from 1968.  "I Heard it Through the Grapevine," "Love Child," "Born to Be Wild," & "Grazing in the Grass" were replaced with "Tighten Up," (the #1 song of the year) "(Sittin' on) the Dock of the Bay," "People Got to Be Free," & "Chain of Fools."

Track listing

1989 original release

1993 re-release

1989 compilation albums
Billboard Top Rock'n'Roll Hits albums
Pop rock compilation albums